Boletus sensibilis is a species of fungus in the  family Boletaceae. The species was first described scientifically by American mycologist Charles Horton Peck in 1879. This species is very similar to two other red boletes, Baorangia bicolor and Boletus pseudosensibilis.

Description
The stipe is nearly round and has a classic club shape. The cap is dirty pinkish red when young, fading to a reddish cinnamon when old. Perhaps the most characteristic trait of this mushroom is its near instantaneous blue staining when handled, which led to the species' name sensibilis, adapted from the Latin word for sensitive. Some describe the smell of the mushroom as a "curry-like" odor, although descriptions of this smell vary. The mushroom is mycorrhizal with hardwoods, and can often be seen growing near oaks or beech in the fall and summer east of the Rocky Mountains. The spore print is greyish olive.

See also
List of Boletus species
List of North American boletes

References

sensibilis
Fungi of North America